The associate attorney general of the United States is the third-highest-ranking official in the U.S. Department of Justice. The associate attorney general advises and assists the attorney general and the deputy attorney general in policies relating to civil justice, federal and local law enforcement, and public safety matters. The associate attorney general is appointed by the president and confirmed by the Senate. 

The Office of the Associate Attorney General oversees the Antitrust Division, the Civil Division, the Environment and Natural Resources Division, the Tax Division, the Office of Justice Programs, the Community Oriented Policing Services, the Community Relations Service, the Office of Dispute Resolution, the Office of Violence Against Women, the Office of Information and Privacy, the Executive Office for United States Trustees, and the Foreign Claims Settlement Commission.

The Office of the Associate Attorney General was created on March 10, 1977, by Attorney General Order No. 699-77.

List of United States associate attorneys general

References

External links
 

 
Associate